is a tram station operated by Tokyo Metropolitan Bureau of Transportation's  Tokyo Sakura Tram located in Shinjuku, Tokyo Japan. It is 11.7 kilometres from the terminus of the Tokyo Sakura Tram at Minowabashi Station.

Layout
Omokagebashi Station has two opposed side platforms.

Surrounding area
 Kanda River

History
 March 30, 1930: Station opened

Railway stations in Japan opened in 1930